This is a list of public art in Hemel Hempstead.

References

 Art and Culture Hemel Hempstead Another list at the community website Hemel On-line. Accessed August 2013.
 Hertfordshire County Council  Public Art (A - Z by title of work). Accessed August 2013

He
Public art